Allen Howard Johnston  (2 September 1912 - 22 February 2002) was an Anglican bishop.

Johnston was born in Auckland, New Zealand.  He was educated at Seddon Memorial Technical College and St John's College, Auckland before beginning his ordained ministry with a curacy at St Mark's Remuera. He then had incumbencies at Dargaville, Northern Wairoa and Otahuhu. In 1949 he became Archdeacon of Waimate, a position he held for four years before being appointed the Bishop of Dunedin. He was consecrated a bishop on 24 February 1953. He was translated to be Bishop of Waikato in 1969 and was additionally elected Archbishop of New Zealand in 1972. He served as a member of the Royal Commission to Inquire into and Report upon the Circumstances of the Convictions of Arthur Allan Thomas for the Murders of David Harvey Crewe and Jeanette Lenore Crewe.

In the 1978 New Year Honours, Johnston was appointed a Companion of the Order of St Michael and St George.

References

1912 births
2002 deaths
People from Auckland
Anglican archdeacons in New Zealand
Primates of New Zealand
20th-century Anglican bishops in New Zealand
Anglican bishops of Dunedin
Anglican bishops of Waikato
20th-century Anglican archbishops in New Zealand
New Zealand Companions of the Order of St Michael and St George